Jovenel Moïse, the president of Haiti, was assassinated on 7 July 2021 at 1 a.m. EDT (UTC−04:00) at his residence in Port-au-Prince. A group of 28 foreign mercenaries, mostly Colombians, are alleged to be responsible for the killing. First Lady Martine Moïse was also shot multiple times in the attack, and was airlifted to the United States for emergency treatment. Later in the day, USGPN (L'Unité de Sécurité Générale du Palais National, or The General Security Unit of the National Palace, headed by Dimitri Herard) killed three of the suspected assassins and arrested 20 more. A manhunt is ongoing for other gunmen as well as the masterminds of the attack. Haitian chief prosecutor Bedford Claude confirmed plans to question Moïse's top bodyguards; none of the president's security guards were killed or injured in the attack. US authorities have since arrested six suspects alleged to have conspired in the assassination.

Background

Election 

Jovenel Moïse was the chosen successor to President Michel Martelly, who was constitutionally barred from seeking reelection in the 2015 presidential election. According to official results, Moïse received 33% of ballots cast in the first round, more than any other candidate but short of the majority required to avoid a second run-off election. These results were disputed by second-place finisher Jude Célestin and others, whose supporters protested. The mandated run-off was repeatedly delayed, prompting further violent protests. The 2015 election results were eventually annulled. When incumbent Martelly's term expired, the legislature appointed Jocelerme Privert as interim President before fresh elections in November 2016. In these elections, Moïse received 56% of the official tally, enough to avoid a run-off. Moïse assumed office on 7 February 2017.

Political turmoil 

During Moïse's time in office, political unrest and violence were common, including violent anti-government protests. The span of Moïse's term in office was disputed, sparking a constitutional crisis. Presidential terms in Haiti are five years, and Moïse claimed a mandate to govern until February 2022, five years after his taking office. However, opposition figures claimed Moïse's mandate ended in February 2021, five years after the victor of the 2015 presidential election would have been sworn in under normal circumstances. Widespread protests demanded Moïse's resignation, and the opposition named Judge Joseph Mécène Jean-Louis as a proposed interim president in February 2021. Moïse received support from the United States government and the Organization of American States (OAS) to remain in office until 2022. Scheduled legislative elections in October 2019, as well as a referendum for a new constitution, were delayed until September 2021, which resulted in Moïse ruling by decree.

Moïse said he foiled a coup attempt to kill him and overthrow the government in February 2021; at least 23 people were arrested. Moïse appointed seven different prime ministers during his time in office, the last of whom was Ariel Henry, who was appointed on 5 July 2021, but had not been sworn in by the time of the attack.

The New York Times revealed that before his death, Moïse had been working to expose the corrupt politicians and businesspeople who were involved in the illegal drug trade, by passing on the information to the United States. The most significant among these people was Charles Saint-Rémy, a businessman and brother-in-law of former Haitian President Michel Martelly. Moïse had also been seeking to end the state capture by affluent individuals, including Martelly's family. After the apparent coup attempt was prevented in 2021 by Dimitri Hérard, the head of the presidential guard, Moïse accused Haiti's elite of being behind it and privately started planning to have them exposed.

Planning 
According to the head of the National Police of Colombia, General Jorge Luis Vargas Valencia, the Colombian attackers were recruited by four companies. He stated that monetary motivation seems to be the only reason behind the attackers agreeing to do the job. The Florida-based company Worldwide Investment Development Group was identified as being the company that raised money for the assassination. Its owner Walter Veintemilla had met with Emmanuel Sanon, a 63-year-old Haitian American and self-described pastor and physician, in May 2021 at a meeting that discussed the likelihood of political upheaval in Haiti, who apparently saw himself as a potential future leader for the country. He agreed to extend loans to him, purportedly for his security during the envisioned Haitian revolution. A large portion of the funds went to a Miami-based security company called CTU Security for the hiring of Colombian mercenaries. President of Colombia Iván Duque Márquez said that most of the Colombians went to Haiti under the impression that they were to work as bodyguards, but a few others were aware of the actual plan.

Parnell Duverger, a retired adjunct professor who taught economics at Broward College, has stated that he had attended around 10 meetings with the accused to plan Haiti's future after Moïse's resignation. These meetings were conducted in Florida and the Dominican Republic months before the assassination. At no point, according to Duverger, was a coup or murder planned. It was assumed that Sanon was eventually going to become the Prime Minister of Haiti. Another participant, Frantz Gilot, who is a consultant for the United Nations, has also denied that there was a plan to kill the President.

According to an investigation carried out by The Wall Street Journal, CTU hired a Colombian veteran named Duberney Capador to recruit other former soldiers, which he accomplished through WhatsApp, promising them a monthly salary of $3,000 to protect Haiti's elite politicians. Capador claimed that CTU had the support of the United States State Department, while they would take part in urban combat and live in "threadbare accommodations". However, there was no mention of a plan to kill or overthrow Moïse.

CTU used its company credit card to buy 19 plane tickets for the suspected assailants, for flights from Colombia's capital Bogotá to the Dominican Republic's capital Santo Domingo. According to Valencia, two of the Colombian suspects flew to the Dominican Republic's capital Santo Domingo from Colombia's capital Bogotá, via Panama, on 6 May 2021. They arrived in Port-au-Prince, Haiti, on 10 May by taking another flight. A further 11 Colombian suspects took a flight to the resort town of Punta Cana, in the Dominican Republic, from Bogotá, on 4 June 2021. They crossed into Haiti on 7 June through the Carrizal border crossing.

The mercenaries were later told they would be guarding Moïse himself. On 22 June, the men met with Antonio Intragio, the owner of CTU, and were told that they would help lift Haiti out of poverty by increasing security in the country, which would attract investors. A judge who interviewed the two Haitian-American suspects, one of whom said he had been in Haiti for one month prior to the attack and the other of whom said he had been in Haiti for six months, said that the plot had been planned intensively for a month at a high-end hotel in Pétion-Ville.

Haitian National Police Chief Léon Charles said that Sanon had arrived in Haiti in June via a plane and had contacted two other people behind the plot. The attackers were initially contracted to guard him, but later were tasked with executing an arrest warrant against President Moïse, so that he could be legally replaced as president. Charles added that he had recruited some of the attackers through CTU Security, and 22 more were recruited later.

According to Charles, one of the suspects, Joseph Felix Badio, who is a former employee of the Haitian government, had assisted the attackers by renting a home to them near President Moïse's home. Reynaldo Corvington, who is the owner of the Haitian security company "Corvington Courier & Security Service", had provided them with lodgings and sirens for their cars with the help of one of the assailants. Former Haitian Senator John Joël Joseph was also stated by Charles to be a mastermind of the plot, furnishing the attackers with weapons and organizing meetings.

According to the complaint filed by the United States Department of Justice, the suspects had been training in Haiti for several weeks, according to interviews with them and images from electronic devices. The suspects have also stated that they originally only planned to kidnap Moïse two weeks before the assassination when he returned from Turkey, but were forced to call it off as they did not receive the signal to carry it out. They also planned to have Fantom 509, a gang consisting of disgruntled former police officers, kidnap Moïse, but later decided against it. One of the arrested suspects stated that they planned to capture him at the Toussaint Louverture International Airport and flee Haiti with him, but had to cancel the operation as they were unable to charter a private plane. He was however told on 6 July that the plan had changed and they were to kill Moïse instead.

Per leaked audio confessions obtained by Noticias Caracol, the suspected assailants admitted their involvement to the Haitian police: that shortly before the operation, they had been ordered by one of the masterminds to kill Moïse and everyone in his home, and had also been told to loot the money stashed there. They were also told to flee to the Presidential Palace, where the new President of Haiti would be sworn in, and that they thought the police would protect them. According to information retrieved by The New York Times, some of the suspects also stated that retrieving Moïse's list, which contained names of the corrupt elite involved in the drug trade, was a main objective of theirs.

Haitian businessman Rodolphe Jaar in an interview with The New York Times admitted to planning and financing the plot, but stated that he believed that the goal was to only remove Moïse from power. Jaar stated that he became involved because he thought that Moïse was authoritarian, and agreed to join after being told that it was being supported by the United States which wanted Moïse gone due to his links with terrorists and drug traffickers. He added that he provided $130,000 for the plot, procured guns, and provided a safehouse for the Colombians. Jaar stated that he had discussed with a leader of the Fantom 509 about assaulting Moïse's residence, but the gang refused to participate about a week before the assassination, and the Colombians were then told that their mission had changed to storming Moïse's residence.

Per the FBI affidavit, Jaar met a co-conspirator before the assassination and planned along with others to have Moïse arrested upon his return from Turkey in mid-June per witness statements. After that plot failed, the other conspirator traveled from Haiti to Miami on June 28 to request assistance in targeting Moïse. The Miami Herald stated that he also informed CTU about it. The affidavit adds that by this point, some conspirators were aware that the actual objective was to kill Moïse.

Assassination 
Former Prime Minister Laurent Lamothe said there are often 100 officers from the presidential guard around the president's home. Neighbors and acquaintances have stated, however, that Moïse only had a few guards around his home on most days. According to a Haitian National Police investigation report, only six were guarding the residence during the time of the assassination. According to the report, two of the guards had acted as informants and the rest showed no resistance at all.

On 7 July 2021, at around 1:00 a.m. local time, a group of gunmen stormed Moïse's home in Pèlerin 5, a district of the upmarket Pétion-Ville quarter of Port-au-Prince. Seven of the assailants were involved in killing the President and four (called the "Delta team") personally entered his bedroom, but the rest stayed outside according to General Jorge Luis Vargas Valencia, chief of the National Police of Colombia. All of the team leaders were carrying a Samsung Galaxy smartphone to take images of his corpse and send it as evidence to the orchestrators of the assassination.

Moïse called several police officials for help after discovering the attackers, but none of them arrived in time. They later started shooting in his office and bedroom, and then ransacked the two rooms. Moïse was severely beaten before he was shot multiple times, killing him at the scene. He was shot with 12 bullets in his chest, arms, right leg, and left hip, and had a shattered left eye. The house was riddled with 9mm and 5.56mm bullets.

First Lady Martine Moïse was also shot multiple times in the attack, suffering gunshot wounds in her arms and thighs, in addition to severe injuries to her hands and abdomen. Martine stated that the attackers also ransacked his room, searching his files, before attacking her, and left after thinking she was dead. Some of the suspects later admitted that the document they had stolen was the list containing names of corrupt individuals involved in drug trafficking. According to the Haitian police, the suspects also robbed the money stored in Moïse's home. The couple's daughter was in the house during the attack. She hid in the bathroom of her younger brother's bedroom and escaped unharmed, while two maids and a guard were tied up by the attackers but were not shot.

A video taken by residents living near the site of the attack contains the voice of one man, speaking in English, who claimed over a megaphone during the attack to be a member of the U.S. Drug Enforcement Administration; however, the assailants did not belong to the agency. Interim prime minister Claude Joseph said later that the attackers carried military rifles, and spoke both English and Spanish. According to those who filmed the attack, the assailants disarmed Moïse's security.

Neighbors of Moïse said they heard heavy machine gun fire shortly after the attack.  Residents reported hearing weapons fire, and "seeing men dressed like commandos in black running through the neighborhoods". Grenades were also dropped from drones during the attack.

A press release issued later that day from the office of interim Prime Minister Joseph blamed the attack on "a group of unidentified individuals". A high-ranking Haitian government official described the attackers as "mercenaries".

Manhunt

Manhunt, gun battle, and arrests 
The Haitian National Police engaged the alleged assassins after they left Moïse's residence. Helen La Lime, the United Nations Special Representative in Haiti, said that some of the gunmen holed up in two buildings in Port-au-Prince.

Police chief Léon Charles said later in the day that the police were still engaged in battle with the gunmen. Three policemen were taken as hostages, but later rescued, after police surrounded a house where some of the suspects were hiding. A shootout between the gunmen and police erupted. Three Colombian men were killed during the gunfight with the police. 18 more Colombians and two Haitian-Americans were arrested.

Angry civilians joined the search for the assailants, and helped police track down some of them who were hiding in bushes. Other civilians set fire to three of the suspects' cars, resulting in the destruction of evidence, with the police chief calling for calm.

Eleven of the suspects broke into Taiwan's embassy courtyard in Pétion-Ville, not far from the president's residence, on 8 July 2021, and Haitian police (who were allowed access to the building after Taiwan waived extraterritoriality) arrested them without encountering any resistance.

The remaining five suspected attackers went on the run. One of them named Mario Antonio Palacios was later arrested in Jamaica in October 2021. He was arrested by authorities of Panama on 3 January 2022 after being deported from Jamaica and transferred to the custody of the United States.

A manhunt is also ongoing to arrest the people who orchestrated the attack. As of 30 July, 44 suspects had been arrested, including 18 Colombians, three Haitian-Americans, 12 Haitian police officers, and six other Haitian civilians. A Haitian businessman, Samir Handal, was arrested in November 2021 by Turkey in relation with the case. He was arrested over renting an office to one of the masterminds and accused of participating in meetings of "political character". The 37th High Criminal Court of Istanbul however rejected extraditing him to Haiti on 4 July 2022, ruling that the reasons for it were not sufficient.

On 8 January 2022, the businessman Rodolphe Jaar was arrested as a suspect in the case while entering the Dominican Republic, after the US requested it. On 14 January, John Joël Joseph, a former senator and political opponent of Moïse, was arrested by the Jamaica Constabulary Force in Jamaica as one of the prominent suspects for Moïse's assassination. His family members were also arrested alongside him. A former police officer, who was part of the security team guarding Moïse on the day of assassination, was arrested in the Dominician Republic and handed over to Haiti on March 2.

Former rebel leader Miradieu Faustin and Divisional Police Inspector Emmanuel Louis were arrested for their alleged involvement in December 2022. By March 2023, the U.S. authorities had arrested 11 suspects.

Suspects 
Those who orchestrated the assassination and their motives are unknown. The gunmen accused of being those who killed Moïse were identified as 28 foreigners, of whom 26 were Colombians and two Americans of Haitian descent. Three of the Colombians were killed by the police in a shootout.  Interim Prime Minister Claude Joseph described the suspects as highly trained and heavily armed foreign mercenaries, a description that was corroborated by the Haitian Ambassador to the United States Bocchit Edmond. The group members spoke in both Spanish and English.

At least 21 suspected assailants are known to be former servicemen of the National Army of Colombia. Most of the soldiers had retired before the COVID-19 pandemic in Colombia. According to the United States Department of Defense, some of them had taken part in military training and education programs organized by the United States in the past.

The two arrested Haitian-Americans were identified as being from South Florida. While they were in custody, they reported to authorities that they found Moïse already dead when the group arrived at his home. Both of them said that they were only acting as translators, and that originally the action was planned to "arrest", not kill, the president. One of them was later confirmed to be an occasional informant for the DEA by the agency on 13 July.

Haitian police said on 11 July that they had arrested one of the suspected masterminds, a Haitian named Emmanuel Sanon, who was based in Florida as a doctor. The authorities accused him of hiring mercenaries to oust and replace Moïse.

On 14 July, the Haitian National Police announced the arrest of Gilbert Dragon, a leader of the former National Revolutionary Front for the Liberation and Reconstruction of Haiti rebel group which had taken part in the 2004 Haitian coup d'état. Reynaldo Corvington, who owns the private security company called "Corvington Courier & Security Service", was also detained. The police meanwhile sought former senator John Joël Joseph and the Venezuelan owner of the Florida-based CTU Security as suspects. One of the suspects being sought is Joseph Felix Badio, a former employee of the Ministry of Justice and Public Security and the government's anti-corruption department who was fired in May 2013 for breaking its ethics rules.

Another of the suspects is businessman and drug trafficker Rodolphe Jaar, who was a former DEA informant and was jailed in 2013 by the United States for stealing drugs which were meant to be seized by the DEA. He had attended a meeting with other suspects and Corvington regarding the mission on June 8. He holds dual nationality, being a citizen of Haiti and Chile.

An arrest warrant was issued against Wendelle Coq Thélot, a former judge of the Court of Cassation, on 23 July, on charges of murder and armed robbery in relation to the assassination. She had been fired by Moïse in February 2021. The Haitian National Police spokesperson, General Marie Michelle Verrier, stated on 30 July that the Colombian and Haitian-American suspects had told the police that they had been to Thélot's home twice and also gave details of agreements that were signed there.

On 14 February 2023, US authorities arrested four men in Florida (three US citizens and one Colombian national) in connection with the assassination, including Intragio and Veintemilla. The suspects are accused of financing the attack and smuggling ballistic vests for the assassins. Authorities alleged that the men had hoped to receive construction contracts in exchange for their role in the assassination plot.

In March 2023, Haitian Police spokesman Garry Desrosiers stated that the police had identified additional suspects in the assassination, but none of the new suspects had been arested. One of the suspects is Vitel'Homme Innocent, leader of the Kraze Barye gang. Arrest warrants were also issued for eight police officers.

Investigation 
Haiti's chief prosecutor Bedford Claude confirmed plans to bring Moïse's top bodyguards in for questioning, including Jean Laguel Civil, the head of the presidential guard, and Dimitri Hérard, the presidential palace's head of security.

The independent Haitian Center for Analysis and Research on Human Rights questioned how the attackers gained entry to the president's bedroom and carried out their attack without killing or injuring any member of the presidential guard. NPR reporter John Otis said, "none of the president's security guards were killed or injured in the attack, and that's a little suspicious... whatever the Colombians were up to, Haitian officials are saying that they definitely were not the masterminds of this assassination." Opposition Senator and 2015 presidential candidate Steven Benoît blamed the president's security detail for the attack, saying the president "was assassinated by his security agents. It wasn’t the Colombians."

The Haitian National Police on 14 July identified one of the suspects as the owner of the CTU Security company in Florida, adding that he had signed a contract in Haiti but gave no further details, stating that the investigation was in advanced stages. Homes of two suspects, one of them being former rebel leader Gilbert Dragon, were also searched, leading to the discovery of many weapons. Three other suspects are also being sought, including one who allegedly provided houses and sirens, to the assassins, and former senator John Joël Joseph. One of the suspects, Joseph Felix Badio, who is a former government employee, was blamed by the Colombian National Police chief General Jorge Luis Vargas Valencia for having ordered two of the suspected assailants to kill Moïse several days before the operation.

Meanwhile, police have also arrested five officials who were part of the president's security in connection with the assassination. One of those arrested includes Dimitri Hérard, the chief of the General Security Unit of the National Palace, which is responsible for guarding the President's residence. 24 police officers who protected Moïse were also being questioned.

Colombian media said Hérard allegedly visited Colombia a few weeks before the assassination, and the Center for Economic and Policy Research reported he is being investigated by US law enforcement for links to arms trafficking. Between January and May 2021, he made 7 trips from and to Colombia, Dominican Republic and Ecuador. He had allegedly used an Ecuadorian identification document to travel from and to Haiti.

The Haitian police also arrested Jean Laguel Civil on 26 July. On 3 August, Haiti's government requested help from the United Nations to conduct an international investigation into the assassination. Haitian officials investigating the cases meanwhile reported that they were receiving death threats and were forced to go into hiding, after the authorities ignored their requests for protection. They also accused the police of procedural violations. Judge Mathieu Chanlatte who was investigating the case withdrew from it on 13 August citing personal reasons. The withdrawal came a day after one of his assistants had mysteriously died.

Claude invited Prime Minister Ariel Henry for an interview on 10 September, stating that shortly after the assassination, Henry had spoken with Joseph Felix Badio, a mastermind of the assassination, twice. The calls were made at 4:07 a.m. and 4:20 a.m. Henry however rejected granting permission for the interview. As a result, Claude requested to the judge investigating the case that charges be filed against Henry and ordered that he be barred from leaving Haiti.

The Prime Minister fired Claude and replaced him with Frantz Louis Juste, but he remained in his position while a source told BBC that Henry did not have the authority to fire the prosecutor. On 16 September, Henry's office stated that many people had called him to inquire about his safety after the assassination and they could not identify every caller, while rejecting the suspicions raised against him.

According to the Haitian National Police investigative report obtained by the Miami Herald in late September 2021, Dragon was in contact with one of the police officers who was guarding Moïse and acting as an informant for the masterminds of the attack. The report also accuses him of designing DEA tags for the assailants. Meanwhile, Hérard was stated to have known three of the suspects and acted as an informant, while supplying the attackers with weapons according to the arrested suspects. Civil was stated to have bribed 80 of Moïse's guards with $80,000 according to the suspects. One of the people called by Badio about 290 times, including during the night of the assassination when the former was in Pétion-Ville, was also in contact with Jaar 203 times during the same time period.

An investigative report published by The New York Times in January 2022 stated that Prime Minister Henry had links with Badio and the two stayed in close contact even after the assassination. Two Haitian officials told the newspaper that Badio entered Henry's residence twice without being impeded by the guards, despite being wanted. Another of the prime suspects,  Rodolphe Jaar, while admitting to having financed and planned the assassination, stated that Badio had described Henry as someone he could count on as an ally and could control after overthrowing Moïse. Jaar claimed that Badio had sought Henry's help in escaping, to which he agreed. He also stated that they planned to make Wendelle Coq-Thélot the new president and that Badio had sought the help of police chief Frantz Elbé in procuring weapons. Elbé however refused stating that he did not have the weapons, but did not try to stop the plot.

Chanlatte's replacement Garry Orélien stepped down from the case on 21 January citing personal reasons. His resignation came after allegations of corruption against him. On 8 February, a recording of Orélien was obtained by CNN, in which Orélien stated that Henry had a role in planning the assassination of Moïse and was friends with the masterminds. This claim was also backed by multiple Haitian law enforcement officials who had investigated the assassination as well, and who also told CNN that Henry was obstructing the investigation. When contacted by CNN, Orélien stated that he did not remember discussing the case with anyone in great detail, stating that "lots of people" were trying to influence it and that he would "not play their game." Later in an interview with Radio Television Caraïbes, he denied accusing Henry while claiming that the CNN report intended to murder his career and force him to go into exile or be killed.

Chavannes Étienne was appointed as the replacement for Orélien in early February, but he stated that he had not decided whether he would accept to take over the case due to risks to his life. He tendered his resignation on 11 February. Merlan Belabre was appointed to take over the investigation on 3 March. He decided to step down after his mandate expired on 25 April. Walther Wesser Voltaire was later appointed to oversee the investigation on 31 May.

Trial 
Mario Antonio Palacios, a 43-year-old Colombian ex-military commando, was arrested in October 2021 for illegally entering Jamaica and was supposed to be deported to Colombia in January 2022. While on a layover in Panama, Palacios agreed to cooperate with federal authorities travel voluntarily to the United States, which had an Interpol red notice against him, instead of travelling back to Colombia. He appeared in a court in Miami on 4 January 2022 and was charged by the United States Department of Justice with "conspiracy to commit murder or kidnapping outside the United States and providing material support resulting in death, knowing that such support would be used to carry out the conspiracy to kill or kidnap." He was the first suspect to be charged by American authorities.

Palacios was part of the "Delta Team", a five-man group of former Colombian military officers that entered Moïse's residence to gun him down. He was the only one who managed to evade authorities and escape. His companions are in Haitian custody and have yet to be charged. American law is being applied in the case of the assassination since part of the planning happened in the United States.

Rodolphe Jaar, one of the prime suspects in the assassination, agreed to cooperate and travel voluntarily to the United States on 19 January after being arrested in the Dominican Republic. He was charged by a court in Miami on the following day with "conspiring to commit murder or kidnapping outside the United States and providing material support resulting in death, knowing or intending that such material support would be used to prepare for or carry out the conspiracy to kill or kidnap." According to the complaint, he provided housing for 20 of the Colombians involved in the assassination. If convicted, he faces a maximum sentence of life in prison. He was also accused of providing weapons to the assailants, being present when another suspect obtained signatures of a former judge for a request for assistance in arresting and imprisoning Moïse, meeting with a co-conspirator and helping his co-conspirators hide after the assassination.

Former senator John Joël Joseph was extradited to the US on 6 May and charged with "conspiring to commit murder or kidnapping", as well as providing material support which resulted in Moïse's assassination, on 9 May. The prosecutors accused him of acquiring cars and attempting to procure weapons for the assailants, meeting with co-conspirators a day before the assassination and being fiercely dedicated to eliminating Moïse.

Aftermath 
The Toussaint Louverture International Airport was closed on 7 July, with planes sent back to their origins.

The former First Lady Martine Moïse was airlifted from Haiti to Fort Lauderdale Executive Airport in Florida, where she arrived at approximately 3:30 pm. The interim Prime Minister Claude Joseph described her condition as stable. She was admitted to Miami's Jackson Memorial Hospital for treatment. The ambassador of Haiti to the United States, Bocchit Edmond, said that her condition was stable but still critical.

Dozens of Haitians started gathering at the U.S. Embassy in Port-au-Prince on 8 July, hoping to seek asylum in the United States because of the insecurity created by President Moïse's assassination, after rumours circulated stating that the United States was going to give out visas to Haitians on humanitarian grounds. Gang violence meanwhile increased in the country following the assassination.

The White House stated that the American government will send senior officials of the Federal Bureau of Investigation and Department of Homeland Security to help Haiti with the case. Colombia dispatched the head of its National Intelligence Directorate and the intelligence director of the National Police of Colombia to assist Haiti alongside Interpol.

Interim Prime Minister Claude Joseph meanwhile requested the United Nations on 7 July to deploy peacekeeping troops to his country until the situation was stabilised. The country also requested deployment of troops from the United States. A senior American government official however told Reuters news agency that there were currently no plans to deploy American troops to Haiti. White House Press Secretary Jen Psaki however stated on 12 July that the request was still under review. President of the United States Joe Biden stated on 15 July that there were no plans to deploy American troops in Haiti.

Jimmy Chérizier, one of the most powerful gang bosses in Haiti and the leader of the G9 gang federation, on 10 July called the assassination of the president a "national and international conspiracy" against Haiti, while blaming the police, opposition politicians and the business class of being behind the killing. He called on his men to protest against the assassination and also warned that his followers would commit violence, while adding that it was time for black people of Haiti to take back control of the business sector from those of Syrian and Lebanese descent.

Also on 10 July, Martine Moïse posted an audio message to her Twitter account, calling on Haiti to "not lose its way" and accusing unnamed people of assassinating her husband to stall a democratic transition of power. She posted photos of herself recovering in the hospital bed to Twitter on 14 July and thanked the medical team that saved her. On 17 July, she returned to Haiti following her release from the hospital.

The funeral for the late President was held on 23 July at his family compound near Cap-Haïtien, amidst a tense atmosphere. Some of the mourners heckled the Haitian officials and politicians, leading to firing of tear gas and gunshots by the police, while foreign diplomats left the funeral earlier. A day before the funeral, protesters had also tried to stop mourners from being able to attend it.

Prime Minister Ariel Henry declared 7 July as a national holiday for Haiti on the first anniversary of the assassination.

Succession 
A 2012 amendment to the Constitution states that the Council of Ministers, under the Presidency of the Prime Minister, exercises the Executive Power until the election of another President. The constitution also stipulates that the National Assembly will elect a provisional president. Complicating matters further, the delay in legislative elections has made the Assembly essentially defunct. Interim Prime Minister Claude Joseph condemned the attack and declared a two-week nationwide state of siege later that day.

Shortly before his death, Moïse had selected Ariel Henry to replace Joseph as the prime minister, but Henry did not assume the role before the assassination. Henry declared himself to be the rightful prime minister after Moïse's death. After the United States chose to support Joseph, Henry stated that it had made a mistake. He however has stated that he is avoiding a conflict over the issue, so as to not worsen the situation in the country.

Joseph announced on 8 July 2021 that legislative elections would still be held in September despite the assassination, stating that, "The Head of Government promises to hold talks with opposition leaders and other actors in national life to calm the socio-political climate and facilitate inclusive and credible elections according to the timetable set by the Provisional Electoral Council." Joseph has said that he is in control of the country until the election of a new president, which will take place as scheduled on 26 September.

United Nations' special envoy for Haiti, Helen La Lime, confirmed that interim Prime Minister Claude Joseph will lead Haiti until the election is held later this year, urging all parties to set aside differences following the assassination of President Jovenel Moïse.

Eight out of ten sitting members of Haiti's Senate chose the Senate speaker Joseph Lambert as the interim President on 9 July. They also selected Ariel Henry to become the prime minister. A dozen political parties also signed an accord calling for Lambert to be installed as the President by 11 July. Interim Prime Minister Claude Joseph however rejected the Senate's decision, stating he did not want a power struggle and the new president should be chosen in the elections.

A group of prominent diplomats called the "Core Group", which is made up of ambassadors to Haiti from Brazil, the European Union, France, Germany, Spain and the United States, in addition to representatives to Haiti from the Organization of American States and the United Nations, urged for creation of "a consensual and inclusive government." It also encouraged Ariel Henry to form a government, a task which had been entrusted to him by the late President, and called on individuals involved in the political, economic and civil society sectors to support the authorities in restoring security.

Joseph told The Washington Post on 19 July that he would be relinquishing his powers as the leader of Haiti and handing the charge to Henry, after having met him privately over the past week. Henry was sworn in on 20 July 2021.

International reactions 
Dominican Republic President Luis Abinader closed the border with Haiti and convened an urgent meeting of military commanders in response to the assassination. The country also banned air travel to Haiti. The diplomatic staff of the Dominican Republic stationed in Haiti was meanwhile evacuated by the Dominican Air Force from Toussaint Louverture International Airport.

International condemnation of the attack included statements from the governments of Argentina, The Bahamas, Canada, Chile, Colombia, France, India, Mexico, Taiwan, Russia, the United Kingdom, the United States, and the Holy See through Pope Francis himself, as well as the Organization of American States and the United Nations Security Council. Suriname declared three days of mourning with flags half mast from 8 to 10 July. Caribbean Community ordered national flags and the CARICOM Standard at half-mast for three days beginning immediately, as well as on the day of the funeral.

On 15 July, President of the United States Joe Biden announced that the United States government would be deploying the United States Marine Corps in order to protect the U.S. Embassy in Port-au-Prince. The Department of State appointed Daniel Lewis Foote as a special envoy to Haiti, tasking him to work with local and international officials in order to stabilise Haiti, while also trying to support holding of free and fair elections.

Marta Lucía Ramírez, the Vice President and Foreign Minister of Colombia, called on Haiti in late July to ensure the legal rights of the Colombian suspects were respected and they were given proper medical care. She further stated that a consular mission had found irregularities in their detention, in addition to them not being provided lawyers. She also added that some of the suspects had been wounded during their arrest and did not receive medical care.

References 

2018–2023 Haitian crisis
2021 crimes in Haiti
Moise
21st century in Port-au-Prince
July 2021 crimes in North America
Moise
Moise
Moise
Violent non-state actor incidents in North America
Colombia–Haiti relations
Haiti–United States relations